"Will You Remember Me Tomorrow?" is a song performed by Norwegian singer Margaret Berger from her second studio album Pretty Scary Silver Fairy (2006). It was released in Norway as the album's second single in 2006. The song peaked at number 13 on the Norwegian Singles Chart.

Music video
A music video for "Will You Remember Me Tomorrow?" was first released onto YouTube on November 15, 2009 at a total length of three minutes and forty-one seconds.

Track listing

Chart performance

Release history

References

2006 singles
Margaret Berger songs
Songs written by Patric Sarin
Songs written by Jukka Immonen
2006 songs
Sony BMG singles